The election for the President of the Fifth Legislative Council took place on 10 October 2012 for members of the 5th Legislative Council of Hong Kong to among themselves elect the President of the Legislative Council of Hong Kong for the duration of the council.

Proceedings 

According to Article 71 of the Hong Kong Basic Law and Rule 4 of the Rules of Procedure of the Legislative Council, the President of the Legislative Council has to be a Chinese citizen of 40 years old or above, a permanent resident of Hong Kong with no right of abode in any foreign country, and has ordinarily resided in Hong Kong for not less than 20 years continuously.

Albert Ho, as the most senior member of the parliament, presided over the special forum on 8 October, which allowed candidates to present their manifesto and answer questions from other members, and the election. Before the voting began, three radical democrats, Leung Kwok-hung, Wong Yuk-man and Chan Wai-yip, questioned if Tsang was a member of the Chinese Communist Party, but Ho insisted no Q&A for the voting session.

While all democrats voted for Leong, Tsang was re-elected with the backing of pro-Beijing camp.

Candidates

Results

References 

Legislative Council of Hong Kong
 
2012 Hong Kong legislative election
2012 elections in China
October 2012 events in China
2012 in Hong Kong
President of the Hong Kong Legislative Council elections